Hegai is a character from the Book of Esther, chapter 2, verses  3, 8 and 15. He is a eunuch placed in charge of Ahasuerus's harem. The Masoretic Text also spells his name Hege.

See Also
Haggai

References

Hebrew Bible people
Book of Esther